Linda Gamble may refer to:

 Linda Gamble (model) (born 1939), American model
 Linda Gamble (basketball) (born 1949), American basketball player